Anete Muižniece-Brice born April 27, 1962, in Riga is a Latvian former basketball player.

Career 

Between the years of 1981 to 1990 she played for the TTT Riga Team and won the European Champion Cup Victory.

References

1962 births
Basketball players from Riga
Latvian women's basketball players
Living people
Soviet women's basketball players